Samuel Dalziel Heron (18 May 1891 – 10 July 1963) was a British born aerospace engineer who made major contributions to the design of piston engines. While working in Britain he carried out the first systematic research into air-cooled cylinders. In the U.S.A he contributed to the design of the Curtiss R-1454, invented the sodium cooled poppet valve and became technical director for aeronautical research for the Ethyl Corporation.

Early life
Sam Dalziel Heron was born on 18 May 1893, in Newcastle upon Tyne, England. He attended Alleyn's School in Dulwich, Goldsmiths' College (London University) and Durham University, near Newcastle upon Tyne.

Early career in the United Kingdom
During the First World War, Heron worked at the Royal Aircraft Factory. From 1915 to 1916 he worked with Professor A.H. Gibson on the first systematic research into the design of air-cooled engine cylinders. They concluded that (1) aluminium should be used for efficient conduction (2) the cylinder head should be in one piece because conduction through metal-to-metal interfaces could not be guaranteed (3) the cylinder head should provide the shortest escape path for heat at the hottest parts across the greatest cross section. Working with  Major F. M. Green, they developed the RAF.8. This was a 14-cylinder 300 hp radial engine, which first ran in September 1916.

On the breakup of the Royal Aircraft Factory in 1917 he joined Siddeley-Deasy. He disagreed with J.D Siddeley over the redesign of the Siddeley-Deasy Puma cylinder head and other design policies. As a result, he resigned and left for the United States in 1921.

Career in the United States
Heron arrived  in the United States in 1921 to work on military applications of the two-valve aircooler
cylinder.  In 1934 he became Director of Aeronautical Research at the Ethyl Corporation in Detroit, a position he held until his retirement in 1946.

Awards
Manley Medal for 'Meritorious contributions to Aircraft Engineering' 1928

Certificate of Merit for Outstanding Fidelity and Meritorious conduct in aid of the war effort against the common enemies of the United States and its Allies in World War II (1948)

Patents

Publications

See also 
 Heron cylinder head

References

Cited sources

External links 
 The Sam D Heron collection at the San Diego Air & Space Museum

English aerospace engineers
American aerospace engineers
1890s births
1965 deaths
20th-century American engineers
British emigrants to the United States